The Estonia Billie Jean King Cup team represents Estonia in the Billie Jean King Cup tennis competition and are governed by the Estonian Tennis Association.

Estonia has competed in Fed Cup since 1992.

In 2022, Estonia competes in the Europe/Africa Zone Group I.

History
Estonia competed in its first Fed Cup in 1992.

2009
Estonia came through Europe/Africa Zone Group I and then edged Israel in a World Group II Play-off to qualify for World Group II for the first time just a year after promotion from Group II.

2010
In the Fed Cup World Group II Estonia won Argentina and advanced to World Group Play-offs, where they lost 2–3 to Belgium.

Current team (2022)

 Elena Malõgina
 Maria Lota Kaul
 Maileen Nuudi
 Katriin Saar
 Anet Angelika Koskel

Players
As of 2022.

Results

1992–1999

2000–2009

2010–2019

2020–

See also
 Fed Cup
 Estonia Davis Cup team

References

External links
 
 Team page at Estonian Tennis Association

Fed Cup
Billie Jean King Cup teams
National sports teams of Estonia